Tribondeau is a surname. Notable people with the surname include:

Luca Tribondeau (born 1996), Austrian skier
Thierry Tribondeau (born 1962), French bobsledder